The canton of Bouzonville is an administrative division of the Moselle department, northeastern France. Its borders were modified at the French canton reorganisation which came into effect in March 2015. Its seat is in Bouzonville.

It consists of the following communes:
 
Alzing
Anzeling
Apach
Berviller-en-Moselle
Bibiche
Bouzonville
Brettnach
Château-Rouge
Chémery-les-Deux
Colmen
Contz-les-Bains
Dalem
Dalstein
Ébersviller
Falck
Filstroff
Flastroff
Freistroff
Grindorff-Bizing
Guerstling
Halstroff
Hargarten-aux-Mines
Haute-Kontz
Heining-lès-Bouzonville
Hestroff
Holling
Hunting
Kerling-lès-Sierck
Kirsch-lès-Sierck
Kirschnaumen
Laumesfeld
Launstroff
Malling
Manderen-Ritzing
Menskirch
Merschweiller
Merten
Montenach
Neunkirchen-lès-Bouzonville
Oberdorff
Rémelfang
Rémeling
Rémering
Rettel
Rustroff
Saint-François-Lacroix
Schwerdorff
Sierck-les-Bains
Tromborn
Vaudreching
Villing
Vœlfling-lès-Bouzonville
Waldweistroff
Waldwisse

References

Cantons of Moselle (department)